Packera subnuda is a species of flowering plant in the aster family known by the common names Buek's groundsel and cleftleaf groundsel. It is native to western North America from the Northwest Territories to northern California to Wyoming, where it grows in high mountain meadows in subalpine and alpine climates.

It is a perennial herb producing one erect stem or a small cluster of 2 or 3 stems from a rhizome and/or fibrous root system. The stems grow 5 to about 30 centimeters tall. The basal leaves have fleshy oval blades up to 3 or 4 centimeters long borne on petioles, with leaves farther up the stem smaller and simpler.

The inflorescence is a single flower head, or occasionally two to five heads. Each is lined with reddish or green phyllaries with green or bluish tips. The head contains many golden yellow disc florets and usually 13 yellow ray florets each roughly a centimeter long.

External links
Jepson Manual Treatment
USDA Plants Profile
Flora of North America
Washington Burke Museum
Photo gallery

subnuda
Flora of Western Canada
Flora of the Western United States
Flora of California
Flora of the Sierra Nevada (United States)
Flora of the Rocky Mountains
Flora without expected TNC conservation status